Puzzle of a Downfall Child is a 1970 American drama film directed by Jerry Schatzberg and starring Faye Dunaway, Barry Morse, Viveca Lindfors, Roy Scheider, and Barry Primus.

Plot
A beautiful but disturbed young woman lives alone at a beach cottage, reliving her past, a life of delusions and lies.
Lou Andreas Sand is a former fashion model whose life has gone into a downward spiral, including drug use and a nervous breakdown. She tells an acquaintance, Aaron Reinhardt, her story for a film he is planning on her, but the details do not ring true.
Lou evidently had a lover who abused her, and a penchant for sex with strange men. Along the way, she became engaged to marry Mark, an ad executive, but apparently jilted him on the day of their wedding, leading to her descent into drugs and an attempted suicide.

Cast
 Faye Dunaway as Lou Andreas Sand
 Barry Primus as Aaron Reinhardt
 Viveca Lindfors as Pauline Galba
 Barry Morse as Dr. Galba
 Roy Scheider as Mark
 Ruth Jackson as Barbara Casey 
 John Heffernan as Dr. Sherman
 Sydney Walker as Psychiatrist
 Clark Burckhalter as Davy Bright
 Shirley Rich as Peggy McCavage
 Emerick Bronson as Falco
 Joe George as 1st Man in Bar
 John Eames as 1st Doctor
 Harry Lee as Mr. Wong
 Jane Halleran as Joan
 Susan Willis as Neighbor
 Barbara Carrera as T.J. Brady
 Sam Schacht as George

Production
The film was Schatzberg's first foray into feature-film making; at the time, he was primarily known as a fashion photographer and had directed a few commercials.

Schatzberg initially worked with French screenwriter Jacques Sigurd, who had written a script involving a woman having an abortion, but the collaboration came to an end due to creative differences. Carole Eastman, whose unused draft for Petulia Schatzberg had enjoyed, was approached to write a new screenplay, and only the title from Sigurd's script was kept on the insistence of Schatzberg. Eastman based the new script on recordings Schatzberg had made of his friend, model Anne St. Marie, while Aaron was in part based on Schatzberg himself. The phrase "downfall child" came from a friend of Schatzberg's who had recounted a nightmare where she was trying to save a child falling from a building.

The name of Faye Dunaway's character is an allusion to Lou Andreas-Salomé.

Theatre

The movie was adapted as a two-character play by Elisabeth Bouchaud (in French) and put on at La Reine Blanche (Paris) in 2017.

See also
 List of American films of 1970

References

External links
 
 
 

1970 films
1970 drama films
American drama films
1970s English-language films
Films with screenplays by Carole Eastman
Films directed by Jerry Schatzberg
Films produced by John Foreman (producer)
Films about modeling
Films scored by Michael Small
Universal Pictures films
1970 directorial debut films
1970s American films